Long Da Lishkara is an Indian Punjabi movie released in 1983 directed and produced by Harpal Tiwana.

Under Jagjit Singh's music direction Gurdas Maan sang "Challa" in this film. The lyrics were written by Shiv Kumar Batalvi and "Sare Pindch Puare Paye" written by Inderjit Hasanpuri.

Cast
Raj Babbar - Raja
Om Puri - Dittu
Gurdas Mann - Channa
Nina Tiwana - Sardarni Sarup Kaur
Harpreet Deol - Preeto
Nirmal Rishi - Gulabo Maasi
Sardar Sohi - Taaya Naara
Mehar Mittal - Rurhiya Kubba
Manjit Maan - Taaro

References

External links
 Long Da Lishkara - RaagTune
 

Punjabi-language Indian films
1980s Punjabi-language films